Poggio Umbricchio  is a frazione of Crognaleto in the Province of Teramo in the Abruzzo region of Italy.

See also
Senarica

Frazioni of the Province of Teramo